Jumping Ship is the 2001 sequel to the 1999 Disney Channel Original Movie, Horse Sense. It stars brothers Joey Lawrence, Matthew Lawrence, and Andy Lawrence. The film was directed by Michael Lange.

Plot
Although Michael has become a more mature individual since the first film and shows more concern for others, he still feels that, by birthright, he deserves to start at the top of his father's law firm. Michael's father does offer him a position at the law firm: a clerking job, and explains that only after thorough knowledge of the firm, a law school graduation, and passing the state bar will he ever be considered for a partnership.

Michael takes a summer vacation with Tommy to Australia. Michael has big plans to show his cousin Tommy a good time aboard a luxury yacht, until he discovers that the yacht he chartered is actually an old, rusty fishing boat. But when modern-day pirates chase the fishing boat, the boys are forced to jump ship, leaving them stranded on a desert island. The pirates are led by Frakes, who earlier had pick-pocketed Michael and discovered through his ID that he comes from a wealthy family. The pirates plan to kidnap Michael for a large ransom.

Meanwhile, Tommy and Michael struggle to find their way on the island to be met by the boat's captain, Jake Hunter, who scuttled the fishing boat to lose the pirates. He later admits he hated being a fishing boat captain and only stuck with it because it was his late-father's calling. After several days the pirates finally find the boys when Michael shoots a flare gun to get an airplanes attention. As they attempt to leave the island on their raft two of the pirates approach them. Michael and Jake swim away and leave Tommy who can't get his life jacket off behind, promising to rescue him later. Michael and Jake come up with a plan to get Tommy back.

Jake and Tommy outwit the pirates by absconding in their speedboat, Frakes attempts to shoot Michael, but fails due to his firearm being gunked up with quicksand he had gotten trapped in earlier while chasing Michael; leaving the villains stranded. As the boys escape they call the Australian Coast Guard for help. The pirates are arrested and their speedboat is seized.

During a lunch the boys have with Michael's father and Tommy's mom, Michael arrives and tells Jake and Tommy that due to asset forfeiture, Frakes' boat is now their property. Michael proposes using the speedboat, combined with the reward money, to launch a boat tour service with Jake and Tommy as his partners, and Jake captaining the boat. Michael also tells his father that he will begin the process for law school application, and accepts his dad's clerking job to help him prepare for that. Michael's father is proud of him for going into the business with him (but now with a more mature view), now realizing that there is no royal road to success.

Cast
Joey Lawrence as Michael Woods
Matthew Lawrence as Jake Hunter
Andrew Lawrence as Tommy Biggs
Anthony Wong as Frakes
Jaime Passier-Armstrong as Jonas
Martin Dingle-Wall as Dante
Susan Walters as Jules Biggs
Stephen Burleigh as Glen Woods
Todd Worden as Mark Sanders
Carly Movizio as Heather Hitt
Jack Heywood as Valet

Home media
The film was released on DVD as an exclusive on the Disney Movie Club promotional website in early 2005. In November 2019, the film became available to stream on Disney+.

External links

2001 television films
2001 films
American action comedy films
Disney Channel Original Movie films
Films set in Australia
Films shot in Australia
Television sequel films
Films directed by Michael Lange
2000s American films